The Gospel of Cerinthus is a lost gospel used by Cerinthus and by Carpocrates. According to Epiphanius, this is a Jewish Gospel or Gnostic Gospel identical to the Gospel of the Ebionites and, apparently, is a truncated version of Matthew's Gospel. Bardy calls it a "Judaizing" rather than Gnostic gospel.

See also
List of Gospels

References

1st-century Christian texts
Apocryphal Gospels
Lost works